The 2021–22 Indiana Pacers season was the 55th season of the franchise and the 46th season in the National Basketball Association (NBA). After the Pacers failed to make the NBA playoffs for the first time since 2015, Nate Bjorkgren was fired on June 9, 2021. The Pacers would later re-hire Rick Carlisle back as the new head coach, reuniting him with the Pacers for their second stint after coaching the team from 2003 to 2007 after coaching 13 seasons with the Dallas Mavericks. The Pacers missed the playoffs for the second consecutive season which would be the first time since 2007–10 that they missed the playoffs in consecutive seasons. During the trade deadline, the Pacers acquired Tyrese Haliburton and Buddy Hield in a deal surrounding Domantas Sabonis.

NBA draft

Entering the draft, the Pacers had one first-round pick and two second-round picks.

Roster

Standings

Division

Conference

Record vs. opponents

Game log

Preseason 

|-style="background:#fcc;"
| 1
| October 5
| @ New York
| 
| Chris Duarte (15)
| Jeremy Lamb (9)
| Chris Duarte (5)
| Madison Square Garden10,090
| 0–1
|-style="background:#cfc;"
| 2
| October 8
| @ Cleveland
| 
| Malcolm Brogdon (27)
| Domantas Sabonis (10)
| T. J. McConnell (7)
| Rocket Mortgage FieldHouse10,024
| 1–1
|-style="background:#cfc;"
| 3
| October 13
| Memphis
| 
| Domantas Sabonis (24)
| Domantas Sabonis (13)
| T. J. McConnell (7)
| Gainbridge Fieldhouse5,997
| 2–1
|-style="background:#fcc;"
| 4
| October 15
| Cleveland
| 
| Goga Bitadze (18)
| Bitadze, Sabonis (6)
| T. J. McConnell (5)
| Gainbridge Fieldhouse6,028
| 2–2

Regular season

|-style="background:#fcc;"
| 1
| October 20
| @ Charlotte
|  
| Domantas Sabonis (33)
| Domantas Sabonis (15)
| Malcolm Brogdon (11)
| Spectrum Center15,521
| 0–1
|-style="background:#fcc;"
| 2
| October 22
| @ Washington
|  
| Myles Turner (40)
| Myles Turner (10)
| Malcolm Brogdon (8)
| Capital One Arena15,407
| 0–2
|-style="background:#cfc;"
| 3
| October 23
| Miami
|  
| Chris Duarte (19)
| Malcolm Brogdon (14)
| T. J. McConnell (5)
| Gainbridge Fieldhouse 17,147
| 1–2
|-style="background:#fcc;"
| 4
| October 25
| Milwaukee
| 
| Malcolm Brogdon (25)
| Domantas Sabonis (13)
| Malcolm Brogdon (7)
| Gainbridge Fieldhouse10,339
| 1–3
|-style="background:#fcc;"
| 5
| October 27
| @ Toronto
|  
| Malcolm Brogdon (18)
| Domantas Sabonis (8)
| Malcolm Brogdon (5)
| Scotiabank Arena19,800
| 1–4
|-style="background:#fcc;"
| 6
| October 29
| @ Brooklyn
| 
| Torrey Craig (28)
| Torrey Craig (11)
| Domantas Sabonis (6)
| Barclays Center16,139
| 1–5
|-style="background:#fcc;"
| 7
| October 30
| Toronto
| 
| Domantas Sabonis (22)
| Domantas Sabonis (14)
| Chris Duarte (6)
| Gainbridge Fieldhouse10,578
| 1–6

|-style="background:#cfc;"
| 8
| November 1
| San Antonio
| 
| Domantas Sabonis (24)
| Domantas Sabonis (13)
| T. J. McConnell (10)
| Gainbridge Fieldhouse10,227
| 2–6
|-style="background:#cfc;"
| 9
| November 3
| New York
| 
| Myles Turner (25)
| Myles Turner (13)
| Malcolm Brogdon (7)
| Gainbridge Fieldhouse11,607
| 3–6
|-style="background:#fcc;"
| 10
| November 5
| @ Portland 
| 
| T. J. McConnell (19)
| Domantas Sabonis (12)
| LeVert, Wanamaker 6
| Moda Center16,841
| 3–7
|-style="background:#cfc;"
| 11
| November 7
| @ Sacramento
| 
| Caris LeVert (22)
| Myles Turner (15)
| T. J. McConnell (4)
| Golden 1 Center12,993
| 4–7
|-style="background:#fcc;"
| 12
| November 10
| @ Denver
| 
| Malcolm Brogdon (25)
| Domantas Sabonis (19)
| T. J. McConnell (9)
| Ball Arena15,232
| 4–8
|-style="background:#cfc;"
| 13
| November 11
| @ Utah
| 
| Malcolm Brogdon (30)
| Brogdon, Turner (9)
| McConnell, Sabonis (9)
| Vivint Arena18,306
| 5–8
|-style="background:#cfc;"
| 14
| November 13
| Philadelphia
| 
| Justin Holiday (27)
| Malcolm Brogdon (10)
| Malcolm Brogdon (10)
| Gainbridge Fieldhouse14,483
| 6–8
|-style="background:#fcc;"
| 15
| November 15
| @ New York
| 
| Malcolm Brogdon (22)
| Domantas Sabonis (15)
| Malcolm Brogdon (7)
| Madison Square Garden16,792
| 6–9
|-style="background:#fcc;"
| 16
| November 17
| @ Detroit
| 
| Malcolm Brogdon (20)
| Domantas Sabonis (11)
| Brogdon, McConnell (4)
| Little Caesars Arena11,457
| 6–10
|-style="background:#fcc;"
| 17
| November 19
| @ Charlotte
| 
| Malcolm Brogdon (16)
| Torrey Craig (7)
| Jeremy Lamb (5)
| Spectrum Center16,787
| 6–11
|-style="background:#cfc;"
| 18
| November 20
| New Orleans
| 
| Domantas Sabonis (20)
| Domantas Sabonis (10)
| Domantas Sabonis (6)
| Gainbridge Fieldhouse15,081
| 7–11
|-style="background:#cfc;"
| 19
| November 22
| @ Chicago
| 
| Domantas Sabonis (21)
| Domantas Sabonis (11)
| Malcolm Brogdon (7)
| United Center21,586
| 8–11
|-style="background:#fcc;"
| 20
| November 24
| L.A. Lakers
| 
| Malcolm Brogdon (28)
| Domantas Sabonis (12)
| T. J. McConnell (8)
| Gainbridge Fieldhouse15,572
| 8–12
|-style="background:#cfc;"
| 21
| November 26
| Toronto
| 
| Domantas Sabonis (23)
| Domantas Sabonis (18)
| Malcolm Brogdon (12)
| Gainbridge Fieldhouse14,579
| 9–12
|-style="background:#fcc;"
| 22
| November 28
| Milwaukee
| 
| Caris LeVert (23)
| Domantas Sabonis (10)
| Domantas Sabonis (5)
| Gainbridge Fieldhouse13,130
| 9–13
|-style="background:#fcc;"
| 23
| November 29
| @ Minnesota
| 
| Malcolm Brogdon (25)
| Domantas Sabonis (25)
| Domantas Sabonis (10)
| Target Center14,191
| 9–14

|-style="background:#fcc;"
| 24
| December 1
| Atlanta
| 
| Malcolm Brogdon (27)
| Domantas Sabonis (10)
| Malcolm Brogdon (9)
| Gainbridge Fieldhouse12,656
| 9–15
|-style="background:#fcc;"
| 25
| December 3
| Miami
| 
| Caris LeVert (27)
| Domantas Sabonis (16)
| Malcolm Brogdon (7)
| Gainbridge Fieldhouse13,854
| 9–16
|-style="background:#cfc;"
| 26
| December 6
| Washington
| 
| Domantas Sabonis (30)
| Domantas Sabonis (10)
| Malcolm Brogdon (8)
| Gainbridge Fieldhouse12,581
| 10–16
|-style="background:#cfc;"
| 27
| December 8
| New York
| 
| Chris Duarte (23)
| Domantas Sabonis (11)
| Duarte, LeVert (60)
| Gainbridge Fieldhouse13,167
| 11–16
|-style="background:#cfc;"
| 28
| December 10
| Dallas
| 
| Caris LeVert (26)
| Sabonis, Turner (10)
| Malcolm Brogdon (8)
| Gainbridge Fieldhouse12,618
| 12–16
|-style="background:#fcc;"
| 29
| December 13
| Golden State
| 
| Domantas Sabonis (30)
| Domantas Sabonis (11)
| Malcolm Brogdon (8)
| Gainbridge Fieldhouse17,018
| 12–17
|-style="background:#fcc;"
| 30
| December 15
| @ Milwaukee
| 
| LeVert, Sabonis (16)
| Domantas Sabonis (14)
| Brogdon, Sabonis, Wanamaker (5)
| Fiserv Forum17,341
| 12–18
|-style="background:#cfc;"
| 31
| December 16
| Detroit
| 
| Caris LeVert (31)
| Duarte, Sabonis (9)
| Lamb, Sabonis (6)
| Gainbridge Fieldhouse13,596
| 13–18
|-style="background:#fcc;"
| 32
| December 21
| @ Miami
| 
| Duarte, LeVert (17)
| Myles Turner (7)
| Brad Wanamaker (5)
| FTX Arena19,600
| 13–19
|-style="background:#cfc;"
| 33
| December 23
| Houston
| 
| Myles Turner (32)
| Myles Turner (10)
| Caris LeVert (11)
| Gainbridge Fieldhouse15,089
| 14–19
|-style="background:#fcc;"
| 34
| December 26
| @ Chicago
| 
| Caris LeVert (27)
| Domantas Sabonis (16)
| Caris LeVert (9) 
| United Center20,475
| 14–20
|-style="background:#fcc;"
| 35
| December 29
| Charlotte
| 
| Caris LeVert (27)
| Domantas Sabonis (18)
| Domantas Sabonis (7)
| Gainbridge Fieldhouse17,608
| 14–21
|-style="background:#fcc;"
| 36
| December 31
| Chicago
| 
| Caris LeVert (27)
| Domantas Sabonis (14)
| LeVert, Sabonis (6)
| Gainbridge Fieldhouse17,515
| 14–22

|-style="background:#fcc;"
| 37
| January 2
| @ Cleveland
| 
| Domantas Sabonis (32)
| Domantas Sabonis (13)
| Domantas Sabonis (7)
| Rocket Mortgage FieldHouse17,808
| 14–23
|-style="background:#fcc;"
| 38
| January 4
| @ New York
| 
| Keifer Sykes (22)
| Domantas Sabonis (8)
| Keifer Sykes (6)
| Madison Square Garden18,449
| 14–24
|-style="background:#fcc;"
| 39
| January 5
| Brooklyn
|  
| Domantas Sabonis (32)
| Domantas Sabonis (12)
| Domantas Sabonis (10)
| Gainbridge Fieldhouse14,176
| 14–25
|-style="background:#cfc;"
| 40
| January 8
| Utah
| 
| Domantas Sabonis (42)
| Sabonis, Turner (6)
| Lance Stephenson (14)
| Gainbridge Fieldhouse13,160
| 15–25
|-style="background:#fcc;"
| 41
| January 10
| @ Boston
| 
| Torrey Craig (19)
| Domantas Sabonis (23)
| Domantas Sabonis (10)
| TD Garden19,156
| 15–26
|-style="background:#fcc;"
| 42
| January 12
| Boston
| 
| Myles Turner (18)
| Oshae Brissett (9)
| Sabonis, Stephenson (6)
| Gainbridge Fieldhouse13,560
| 15–27
|-style="background:#fcc;"
| 43
| January 14
| Phoenix
| 
| Justin Holiday (25)
| Domantas Sabonis (14)
| Caris LeVert (9)
| Gainbridge Fieldhouse14,019
| 15–28
|-style="background:#fcc;"
| 44
| January 17
| @ L.A. Clippers
| 
| Caris LeVert (27)
| Domantas Sabonis (11)
| Domantas Sabonis (7)
| Crypto.com Arena15,080
| 15–29
|-style="background:#cfc;"
| 45
| January 19
| @ L.A. Lakers
| 
| Caris LeVert (30)
| Torrey Craig (13)
| Domantas Sabonis (10)
| Crypto.com Arena17,818
| 16–29
|-style="background:#cfc;"
| 46
| January 20
| @ Golden State
| 
| Chris Duarte (27)
| Goga Bitadze (9)
| Goga Bitadze (5)
| Chase Center18,064
| 17–29
|-style="background:#fcc;"
| 47
| January 22
| @ Phoenix
| 
| Duarte, Stephenson (17)
| Goga Bitadze (11) 
| Chris Duarte (4)
| Footprint Center17,071
| 17–30
|-style="background:#fcc;"
| 48
| January 24
| @ New Orleans
| 
| Duane Washington Jr. (21)
| Oshae Brissett (9)
| Caris LeVert (8)
| Smoothie King Center15,581
| 17–31
|-style="background:#fcc;"
| 49
| January 26
| Charlotte
| 
| Bitadze, Jackson (17)
| Bitadze, Brissett, Stephenson (6) 
| Lance Stephenson (10) 
| Gainbridge Fieldhouse14,116
| 17–32
|-style="background:#cfc;"
| 50
| January 28
| @ Oklahoma City
| 
| Domantas Sabonis (24)
| Domantas Sabonis (18)
| Domantas Sabonis (10)
| Paycom Center15,106
| 18–32
|-style="background:#fcc;"
| 51
| January 29
| @ Dallas
| 
| Duane Washington Jr. (22)
| Domantas Sabonis (15)
| Domantas Sabonis (8)
| American Airlines Center19,831
| 18–33
|-style="background:#cfc;"
| 52
| January 31
| L.A. Clippers
| 
| Isaiah Jackson (26)
| Isaiah Jackson (10)
| Caris LeVert (9)
| Gainbridge Fieldhouse14,629
| 19–33

|-style="background:#fcc;"
| 53
| February 2
| Orlando
| 
| Caris LeVert (26)
| Terry Taylor (16)
| Lance Stephenson (6)
| Gainbridge Fieldhouse14,528
| 19–34
|-style="background:#fcc;"
| 54
| February 4
| Chicago
| 
| Caris LeVert (42)
| Terry Taylor (14)
| Caris LeVert (8)
| Gainbridge Fieldhouse16,355
| 19–35 
|-style="background:#fcc;"
| 55
| February 6
| @ Cleveland
| 
| Chris Duarte (22)
| Domantas Sabonis (11)
| Domantas Sabonis (4)
| Rocket Mortgage FieldHouse19,432
| 19–36
|-style="background:#fcc;"
| 56
| February 8
| @ Atlanta
| 
| Chris Duarte (25)
| Terry Taylor (10)
| Lance Stephenson (8)
| State Farm Arena14,265
| 19–37
|-style="background:#fcc;"
| 57
| February 11
| Cleveland
| 
| Tyrese Haliburton (23)
| Oshae Brissett (11)
| Buddy Hield (8)
| Gainbridge Fieldhouse15,075
| 19–38
|-style="background:#fcc;"
| 58
| February 13
| Minnesota
| 
| Brissett, Haliburton (22)
| Oshae Brissett (13)
| Tyrese Haliburton (16)
| Gainbridge Fieldhouse13,532
| 19–39
|-style="background:#fcc;"
| 59
| February 15
| @ Milwaukee
| 
| Buddy Hield (36)
| Terry Taylor (9)
| Tyrese Haliburton (8)
| Fiserv Forum17,341
| 19–40
|-style="background:#cfc;"
| 60
| February 16
| Washington
| 
| Tyrese Haliburton (21)
| Terry Taylor (9)
| Tyrese Haliburton (14)
| Gainbridge Fieldhouse14,540
| 20–40
|-style="background:#fcc;"
| 61
| February 25
| Oklahoma City
| 
| Buddy Hield (29)
| Oshae Brissett (15)
| Tyrese Haliburton (11)
| Gainbridge Fieldhouse15,182
| 20–41
|-style="background:#cfc;"
| 62
| February 27
| Boston
| 
| Oshae Brissett (27)
| Jalen Smith (10)
| Tyrese Haliburton (9)
| Gainbridge Fieldhouse16,872
| 21–41
|-style="background:#fcc;"
| 63
| February 28
| @ Orlando
| 
| Tyrese Haliburton (23) 
| Jalen Smith (8)
| Tyrese Haliburton (7) 
| Amway Center13,014
| 21–42

|-style="background:#cfc;"
| 64
| March 2
| @ Orlando
| 
| Malcolm Brogdon (31)
| Jalen Smith (15)
| Malcolm Brogdon (8)
| Amway Center11,221
| 22–42
|-style="background:#fcc;"
| 65
| March 4
| @ Detroit
| 
| Malcolm Brogdon (26)
| Jalen Smith (11) 
| Buddy Hield (9)
| Little Caesars Arena17,244
| 22–43
|-style="background:#fcc;"
| 66
| March 6
| @ Washington
| 
| Malcolm Brogdon (27)
| Buddy Hield (8)
| Tyrese Haliburton (11)
| Capital One Arena13,937
| 22–44
|-style="background:#fcc;"
| 67
| March 8
| Cleveland
| 
| Tyrese Haliburton (25) 
| Goga Bitadze (9)
| Malcolm Brogdon (12)
| Gainbridge Fieldhouse14,066
| 22–45
|-style="background:#cfc;"
| 68
| March 12
| @ San Antonio
| 
| Haliburton, Washington Jr. (19)
| Jalen Smith (11)
| Tyrese Haliburton (10) 
| AT&T Center14,605
| 23–45
|-style="background:#fcc;"
| 69
| March 13
| @ Atlanta
| 
| Haliburton, Hield (25)
| Isaiah Jackson (15)
| Tyrese Haliburton (10) 
| State Farm Arena17,038
| 23–46
|-style="background:#fcc;"
| 70
| March 15
| Memphis
| 
| Jalen Smith (15)
| Smith, Taylor (8)
| Tyrese Haliburton (8)
| Gainbridge Fieldhouse15,027
| 23–47
|-style="background:#cfc;"
| 71
| March 18
| @ Houston
| 
| Malcolm Brogdon (25)
| Jalen Smith (10)
| Tyrese Haliburton (7) 
| Toyota Center13,748
| 24–47
|-style="background:#cfc;"
| 72
| March 20
| Portland
| 
| Oshae Brissett (24)
| Oshae Brissett (9)
| Lance Stephenson (11)
| Gainbridge Fieldhouse16,067
| 25–47
|-style="background:#fcc;"
| 73
| March 23
| Sacramento
| 
| Buddy Hield (25)
| Oshae Brissett (10)
| Tyrese Haliburton (15)
| Gainbridge Fieldhouse14,227
| 25–48
|-style="background:#fcc;"
| 74
| March 24
| @ Memphis
| 
| Lance Stephenson (25)
| Justin Anderson (9)
| Tyrese Haliburton (8)
| FedEx Forum16,205
| 25–49
|-style="background:#fcc;"
| 75
| March 26
| @ Toronto
| 
| Oshae Brissett (21)
| Oshae Brissett (8)
| Tyrese Haliburton (12)
| Scotiabank Arena19,800
| 25–50
|-style="background:#fcc;"
| 76
| March 28
| Atlanta
| 
| Buddy Hield (26)
| Jalen Smith (6)
| Tyrese Haliburton (13)
| Gainbridge Fieldhouse14,212
| 25–51
|-style="background:#fcc;"
| 77
| March 30
| Denver
| 
| Buddy Hield (20)
| Goga Bitadze (10)
| Tyrese Haliburton (12)
| Gainbridge Fieldhouse15,036
| 25–52

|-style="background:#fcc;"
| 78
| April 1
| @ Boston
| 
| Tyrese Haliburton (30)
| Brissett, Smith (6)
| Lance Stephenson (11)
| TD Garden19,156
| 25–53
|-style="background:#fcc;"
| 79
| April 3
| Detroit
| 
| Oshae Brissett (20)
| Oshae Brissett (10)
| Tyrese Haliburton (17)
| Gainbridge Fieldhouse17,407
| 25–54
|-style="background:#fcc;"
| 80
| April 5
| Philadelphia
| 
| Buddy Hield (25)
| Buddy Hield (11)
| Haliburton, Hield, McConnell (5)
| Gainbridge Fieldhouse15,583
| 25–55
|-style="background:#fcc;"
| 81
| April 9
| @ Philadelphia
| 
| Oshae Brissett (20)
| Brissett, Jackson (7)
| Tyrese Haliburton (9)
| Wells Fargo Center21,171
| 25–56
|-style="background:#fcc;"
| 82
| April 10
| @ Brooklyn
| 
| Oshae Brissett (28)
| Oshae Brissett (8)
| Tyrese Haliburton (10) 
| Barclays Center17,967
| 25–57

References

Indiana Pacers seasons
Indiana Pacers
Indiana Pacers
Indiana Pacers